The Vienna Convention on the Law of Treaties Between States and International Organizations or Between International Organizations  (VCLTIO) is an extension of the Vienna Convention on the Law of Treaties which deals with treaties between States. It was developed by the International Law Commission and opened for signature on 21 March 1986.

Article 85 of the Convention provides that it enters into force after ratification or accession by 35 states.  the treaty has been ratified or acceded to by 33 states. As a result, the Convention is not yet in force.

Parties to the convention
33 state parties have ratified or acceded to the Convention: Mexico, Colombia, Argentina, Uruguay, Senegal, Liberia, Gabon, Australia, United Kingdom, Denmark, Sweden, Estonia, Belarus, Moldova, Bulgaria, Cyprus, Greece, Spain, Germany, Netherlands, Belgium, Switzerland, Liechtenstein, Italy, Austria, Croatia, Hungary, Czech Republic, Slovakia, Malta, Albania, Portugal and Palestine.

Additionally, there are 12 international organizations that issued formal confirmations of the convention: IAEA, ICAO, Interpol, ILO, IMO, OPCW, CTBTO Preparatory Commission, the UN, UNIDO, UPU, WHO, WIPO.

The signatory states that have not ratified are: Ivory Coast, DR Congo, United States, Brazil, Bosnia and Herzegovina, South Korea, Japan, Serbia, Montenegro, Morocco, Egypt, Sudan, Burkina Faso, Benin, Zambia, and Malawi. Additionally, there are international organizations that have signed, but not completed their formal confirmation procedures: CoE, FAO, ITU, UNESCO and WMO.

See also 
 Vienna Convention on Diplomatic Relations (1961)
 Vienna Convention on Consular Relations (1963)
 Vienna Convention on the Law of Treaties (1969)
 List of Vienna conventions
 Jus tractatuum

Notes

References

External links 
 Vienna Convention on the Law of Treaties between States and International Organizations or between International Organizations 1986
 The International Law Commission's Draft articles on the law of treaties between States and international organizations or between international organizations with commentaries 1982
 Introductory note by Karl Zemanek, procedural history note and audiovisual material on the Vienna Convention on the Law of Treaties between States and International Organizations or between International Organizations in the Historic Archives of the United Nations Audiovisual Library of International Law

Treaties drafted by the International Law Commission
Treaties concluded in 1986
Treaties not entered into force
1986 in Austria
United Nations treaties
Treaties of Albania
Treaties of Argentina
Treaties of Australia
Treaties of Austria
Treaties of Belarus
Treaties of Belgium
Treaties of the People's Republic of Bulgaria
Treaties of Colombia
Treaties of Croatia
Treaties of Cyprus
Treaties of the Czech Republic
Treaties of Denmark
Treaties of Estonia
Treaties of Gabon
Treaties of West Germany
Treaties of Greece
Treaties of the Hungarian People's Republic
Treaties of Italy
Treaties of Liberia
Treaties of Liechtenstein
Treaties of Malta
Treaties of Mexico
Treaties of the Netherlands
Treaties of Moldova
Treaties of the State of Palestine
Treaties of Portugal
Treaties of Senegal
Treaties of Slovakia
Treaties of Spain
Treaties of Sweden
Treaties of Switzerland
Treaties of the United Kingdom
Treaties of Uruguay
Treaties extended to the Netherlands Antilles
Treaties extended to Aruba
Treaties extended to Greenland
Treaties extended to the Faroe Islands
Treaty law treaties
Treaties entered into by the World Health Organization
Treaties entered into by the United Nations